This is a list of programs broadcast by Nickelodeon (Latin America). It does not include programs from sister channels or other countries.

Current programming

 ALVINNN!!! and the Chipmunks
 Anna and Friends
 Baby Shark's Big Show!
 Best & Bester
 Big Nate
 The Casagrandes
 Danger Force
 Garden Academy
 Kamp Koral: SpongeBob's Under Years
 The Loud House
 Middlemost Post
 Nick Snack
 PAW Patrol
 The Patrick Star Show
 Rock Island Mysteries
 Rugrats (2021)
 The Smurfs
 SpongeBob SquarePants
 Spyders
 Star Trek: Prodigy
 Transformers: EarthSpark
 Tyler Perry's Young Dylan

Former programming

 11-11: En mi cuadra nada cuadra
 100 Things to Do Before High School
 31 Minutos
 Aaahh!!! Real Monsters
 Abby Hatcher
 The Addams Family
 The Adventures of Jimmy Neutron: Boy Genius
 The Adventures of Kid Danger
 The Adventures of Paddington
 The Adventures of Pete & Pete
 The Adventures of Tintin
 ALF
 All Grown Up!
 All That
 Allegra's Window
 The Amanda Show
 America's Most Musical Family
 The Angry Beavers
 Animorphs
 Are You Afraid of the Dark?
 As Told by Ginger
 The Astronauts
 Avatar: The Last Airbender
 Babar
 Back at the Barnyard
 Bananas in Pyjamas
 The Barbarian and the Troll
 Barbie: Life in the Dreamhouse
 Bella and the Bulldogs
 Ben & Holly's Little Kingdom
 Bewitched
 The Big Comfy Couch
 Big Time Rush
 Blaze and the Monster Machines
 Blazing Dragons
 Blue's Clues
 Blue's Clues & You!
 Blue's Room
 Breadwinners
 The Brothers Flub
 The Brothers Garcia
 Bubble Guppies
 Bucket & Skinner's Epic Adventures
 Bunsen Is a Beast 
 The Bureau of Magical Things
 The Busy World of Richard Scarry
 Butterbean's Cafe
 Captain Flamingo
 The Care Bears
 Care Bears: Unlock the Magic
 Castelo Rá-Tim-Bum
 CatDog
 Catscratch
 ChalkZone
 Chica vampiro
 Clarissa Explains It All
 Club 57
 Clueless
 Cousin Skeeter
 Cousins for Life
 Creepschool
 Cubix
 Danny Phantom
 Deer Squad
 Diff'rent Strokes
 Digby Dragon
 Doggy Day School
 Dora the Explorer
 Dora and Friends: Into the City!
 Dorg Van Dango
 Doug
 Dougie in Disguise
 Drake & Josh
 Drama Club
 El Tigre: The Adventures of Manny Rivera
 The Elephant Princess
 Eureeka's Castle
 Ever After High
 Every Witch Way
 The Facts of Life
 The Fairly OddParents
 The Fairly OddParents: Fairly Odder
 Fanboy & Chum Chum
 Fifi and the Flowertots
 Flying Rhino Junior High
 Food Hunters
 Frankenstein's Cat
 Fred: The Show
 Fresh Beat Band of Spies
 The Fresh Prince of Bel-Air
 Galidor
 Game Shakers
 Generation O!
 Get Blake!
 Get Smart
 Global Guts
 Go, Diego, Go!
 Goldie's Oldies
 Grachi
 Group Chat
 Growing Pains
 Growing Up Creepie
 Gullah Gullah Island
 Happy Days
 Harvey Beaks
 The Haunted Hathaways
 Heidi, bienvenida a casa
 Henry Danger
 Hey Arnold!
 House of Anubis
 How to Rock
 Hunter Street
 I Am Frankie
 I Dream of Jeannie
 iCarly
 Instant Mom
 Invader Zim
 Isa TKM/Isa TK+
 It's Pony
 Jimmy Two-Shoes
 The Journey of Allen Strange
 Juanito Jones
 Julie and the Phantoms
 Just for Kicks
 KaBlam!
 Kally's MashUp
 Kappa Mikey
 Karkú
 Kenan & Kel
 Knight Squad
 Kung Fu Panda: Legends of Awesomeness
 La Maga y el Camino Dorado
 Legend of the Dragon
 The Legend of Korra
 Legends of the Hidden Temple
 Lego City Adventures
 Life with Boys
 Little Bear
 Little Bill
 Little Charmers
 Littlest Pet Shop
 Lola and Virginia
 Lost in the West
 Louie
 Lucky Fred
 The Magic School Bus
 Make It Pop
 Making the Band
 Martin Mystery
 Marvin Marvin
 Massive Monster Mayhem
 Max & Ruby
 Max & Shred
 The Mighty B!
 Mischief City
 Miss XV
 Monsters vs. Aliens
 Monsuno
 Mork & Mindy
 Mr. Meaty
 The Munsters
 Mutt & Stuff
 My Favorite Martian
 My Life as a Teenage Robot
 The Mystery Files of Shelby Woo
 Mysticons
 The Naked Brothers Band
 Ned's Declassified School Survival Guide
 Nella the Princess Knight
 The Neverending Story
 Ni Hao, Kai-Lan
 Nickelodeon Guts
 Nickelodeon's Unfiltered
 Nickers
 Nicky, Ricky, Dicky & Dawn
 Noobees
 Oh Yeah! Cartoons
 Ollie's Pack
 The Other Kingdom
 Overlord and the Underwoods
 The Oz Kids
 Papaya Bull
 The Penguins of Madagascar
 Perfect Strangers
 Peter Rabbit
 Pig Goat Banana Cricket
 Pippi Longstocking
 Planet Sheen
 Poochini's Yard
 PopPixie
 Power Rangers Samurai
 Rabbids Invasion
 Rainbow Butterfly Unicorn Kitty
 Rainbow Rangers
 Rank the Prank
 Regal Academy
 The Ren & Stimpy Show
 Renford Rejects
 Ricky Sprocket: Showbiz Boy
 Ride
 Rise of the Teenage Mutant Ninja Turtles
 Roary the Racing Car
 Robot and Monster
 Rocket Monkeys
 Rocket Power
 Rocko's Modern Life
 Rotten Ralph
 Rugrats
 Rupert
 Rusty Rivets
 S Club 7
 Sabrina, the Teenage Witch
 Sam & Cat
 Sanjay and Craig
 Santiago of the Seas
 School of Rock
 See Dad Run
 Shimmer and Shine
 Side Hustle
 Sister, Sister
 Skimo
 Skyland
 Space Cases
 Speed Racer: The Next Generation
 Spider-Man: The New Animated Series
 Star Falls
 Stickin' Around
 Stuart Little: The Animated Series
 The Substitute
 Sueña conmigo
 Sunny Day
 Supah Ninjas
 T.U.F.F. Puppy
 Taina
 Tak and the Power of Juju
 Talia in the Kitchen
 Team Umizoomi
 Teenage Mutant Ninja Turtles
 The Three Friends and Jerry
 The Thundermans
 Tickety Toc
 Toni, la Chef
 ToonMarty
 Top Wing
 Trollz
 The Troop
 True Jackson, VP
 Unfabulous
 Victorious
 Vikki RPM
 Warped!
 Wayside
 Welcome to the Wayne
 Wendell & Vinnie
 Where on Earth Is Carmen Sandiego?
 The Wild Thornberrys
 WITS Academy
 Winx Club
 Wonder Pets
 The World of Tosh
 The Wubbulous World of Dr. Seuss
 The X's
 Yakkity Yak
 Yo soy Franky
 You Gotta See This
 You're on Nickelodeon, Charlie Brown
 Yu-Gi-Oh!
 Yu-Gi-Oh! GX
 Yvon of the Yukon
 Zoey 101
 Zoofari

See also
 List of programs broadcast by Nickelodeon (Brazil)

References

External links 
 Official site

Nickelodeon Latin America
Latin America
Television articles with incorrect naming style
Nickelodeon original programming